Sociology of food is the study of food as it relates to the history, progression, and future development of society. This includes production, distribution, conflict, medical application, ritual, spiritual, and cultural applications, environmental and labor issues.

0-A 
5 A Day - acceptable daily intake - aggregate nutrient density index - ageusia - animal source foods - additives - aeroponics - agriculture - alcohol - alcoholic beverage control state - algaculture - Androphagi - antibiotic - antioxidant - appellation - Appellation d'origine contrôlée - apiculture - aphagia - appetite - aquaculture - asado

B 
baker's dozen
- baking
- Banchan
- barbecue
- barbecue in the United States
- beer
- beer style
- benzopyrene
- berenklauw
- beverage-can stove
- biodiversity
- blind-baking
- birthday cake
- bottom trawling
- bottom's up
- bottled water
- braai
- breadbox
- broasting
- broiling
- bulgogi
- bread
- bushfood
- bushmeat
- bycatch

C 
canning
- cannibalism
- carbohydrate
- carry over cooking
- cart noodle
- catch and release
- casu marzu
- cereal
- cha chaan teng
- charbroil
- Churchkhela
- comfort food
- Common Agricultural Policy
- Common Fisheries Policy
- control of fire by early humans
- conveyor belt sushi
- convenience food
- cooking
- cookware and bakeware
- cretan diet
- curing
— culinary
— curry
- catering

D 
dai pai dong
- deep frying
- Denominazione di origine controllata
- diabetes
- diet
- dietary fiber
- dietary supplement
- dieting
- digestion
- dim sum
- distilled beverage
- drying
- dysgeusia

E 
eating
— eating disorders
— enzyme
— entomophagy
— environmental vegetarianism
— essential nutrient
— ethics
— exercise

F 
- factory ship
- famine
- FARMA
- farmers' market
- fast food
- fasting
- fat
- fat acceptance movement
- finger bowl
- fishing
- food allergy
- food bank
- food chain
- food consumption by class
- food contaminants
- food delivery
- food energy
- Food for Peace
- food fortification
- food guide pyramid
- food irradiation
- food labeling regulations (U.K., E.U.)
- food microbiology
- food policy
- food porn
- food price crisis
- food processing
- food safety
- food security
- food sovereignty
- food vs fuel
- FreeRice
- Free The Hops
- fresherized
- from scratch
- fruitarianism
- functional food
- food technology
- foodservice
- FoodBeeper

G 
galbi
— game
— Game & Wildlife Conservation Trust
— Gas Mark
— gastronomy
— geographical indication
— Geographical indications and traditional specialities (EU)
— geoponic
— glycemic index
- Gourmet Museum and Library
— Green Revolution
— grilling
- grocery store

H 
healthy eating pyramid
— health claims on food labels
— Hechsher Tzedek
— high altitude cooking
— High-Level Conference on World Food Security
- home canning
— hot salt frying
— hot sand frying
— hunger
— hunter-gatherer
— hunting
— hydroponics

I 
ikizukuri
— inedia
— indigenous Australian food groups
— International English food terms

J 
Jamaican jerk spice

K 
Kansas City-style barbecue
— ketogenic diet
— kitchen stove
— Korean barbecue

L 
leftovers
— liqueur
— local food
— lou mei

M 
main course
— mariculture
— marination
— Marine Protected Area
— mastication
— maximum sustainable yield
— meal
— meat analogue
-(metabolic foods)
— mushroom hunting
— mineral
— MyPyramid

N 
Nasi liwet — nutraceutical — nutrition — Nyotaimori

O 
obesity
— Odori ebi
— oenology
— oenophilia
- Okazu
- Opson
- Opsophagos
— OREC
— overfishing
_ online food ordering

P 
parbaking
— pasteurization
— persistence hunting
— pescetarianism
— placentophagy
— preservation
— pickling
— pink slime
— portable stove
— prebiotic
— preservatives
— pressure cooking
— pressure frying
— probiotic
— protein

Q 
Quality Wines Produced in Specified Regions

R 
rocket stove—rotisserie—root vegetable

S 
sannakji—sashimi—sautéing—savoury (small dish)—seasoning—shark finning—siu mei—Slow Food—soup—soy—starvation—surimi—sushi—sustainability—sustainable food system

T 
taste — tea culture — teppanyaki — teriyaki — terroir — trans fat — trophic dynamics — tropical agriculture — tureen

U 
umami — underweight — unsaturated fat — urban agriculture — USDA National Nutrient Database

V 
veganism — vegetarianism — vertical farming — vitamin — vitamin c megadosage — viticulture

W 
water — wedding cake — weight cutting — weight loss — whole grain stamp — wildlife — wine — world food day — world food prize — world food programme

X 
xanthan gum

Y 
yakiniku — yakisoba — yakitori — ye wei — yum cha — yo-yo effect

Z

Food History

Wine History
Alban wine—Ancient Greece and wine—Ancient Rome and wine—Ancient Rome and wine—Caecuban wine—Chian wine—Coan wine—Conditum Paradoxum—Cretan wine—Falernian wine—Great French Wine Blight

Fumarium—History of wine—History of American wine—History of Bordeaux wine—History of California wine—History of French wine—History of Oregon wine production—History of Rioja wine

Hypocras—Lesbian wine—Marriage at Cana—Passum—Persian wine—Police des Vins—Retsina—Shedeh—Shirazi wine—Vino Greco

Food-Related Lists
List of basic cooking topics—List of food companies

Additive/Preservative Lists
Foods containing tyramine—List of food additives—List of food additives, Codex Alimentarius—List of unrefined sweeteners

Cultivar Lists
apple—basil—capsicum—mango—pear—strawberry

Edible Lists

Food
Culinary Fruits—Vegetables—Culinary Herbs and Spices—Grape Varieties

Culinary Nuts—Edible Seeds—Edible Flowers—Edible Leaves

List of soups—List of raw fish dishes—List of sushi and sashimi ingredients

Cheese
Main list
American cheese — British cheese — Dutch cheese — French cheese — Italian cheese — Irish cheese — Cheeses of Switzerland
Greek PDO cheeses — Italian PDO cheese

Beverages
Glossary of wine terms—List of alcoholic beverages—List of liqueurs—List of non-alcoholic cocktails—List of soft drinks by country

List of Appellation d'Origine Contrôlée liqueurs and spirits—List of Appellation d'Origine Contrôlée wines

List of Italian DOC wines—List of Italian DOCG wines—List of Italian IGT wines

List of beer styles—List of commercial brands of beer

Miscellaneous Lists
List of co-operative federations—List of cuisines—List of diets—List of famines

List of food preparation utensils—List of Japanese cooking utensils

List of geographical designations for spirit drinks in the European Union

See also

Foodborne Illness Outbreaks
Canada—United States

Environmental
Fishing—Meat Production—Pesticides

Measurements
Cooking weights and measures—Gastronorm sizes—Zadoks scale

Miscellaneous
Alcohol laws of the United States by state

Fisheries glossary

"The Big Eight" food Allergies

Glossary of terms associated with diabetes

List of countries by alcohol consumption

Population dynamics of fisheries

Taboo food and drink

Further reading
Beardsworth, Alan. (1997)' Sociology on the Menu: An Invitation to the Study of Food and Society, Routledge, 

Counihan, Carole. (2007). Food And Culture: A Reader, Routledge 

Germov, John. (2004). A Sociology of Food & Nutrition: The Social Appetite, Oxford University Press, 

Kingsolver, Barbara. (2007). Animal, Vegetable, Miracle: A Year of Food Life, Harpercollins, 

Levenstein, Harvey. (1988). Revolution at the Table: The Transformation of the American Diet, Oxford University Press, 

Nestle, Marion. (2003). Food Politics: How the Food Industry Influences Nutrition and Health-- Marion Nestle, Ph.D., M.P.H., Univ of California Press, 

Mennell, Stephen. (1993). The Sociology of Food: Eating, Diet and Culture, SAGE Publications, 

Ritzer, George. (2007). The McDonaldization of Society, SAGE Publications, 

Schlosser, Eric. (2001). Fast Food Nation: The Dark Side of the All American Meal, HarperCollins 

Smith, Alisa. & MacKinnon, J.B. (2007). The 100-Mile Diet, Random House Canada 

Watson, James, L. (2005). The Cultural Politics of Food and Eating, Blackwell Publishing

Professional associations
Academy of Nutrition and Dietetics

Cereals & Grains Association

Feeding America

Food and Agriculture Organization - (United Nations)

International Food Policy Research Institute

International Fund for Agricultural Development

External links
 The Food Timeline
 World of Food Science
 Research Center for the History of Food and Drink

Food
Sociology lists